Benson Mulomba (born 15 December 1949) is a Zambian middle-distance runner. He competed in the men's 800 metres at the 1972 Summer Olympics.

References

1949 births
Living people
Athletes (track and field) at the 1972 Summer Olympics
Zambian male middle-distance runners
Olympic athletes of Zambia
Athletes (track and field) at the 1970 British Commonwealth Games
Commonwealth Games competitors for Zambia
Place of birth missing (living people)